BRP Davao del Sur (LD-602) is the second ship of the Tarlac-class landing platform dock of the Philippine Navy. She is the second ship to be named after the Philippine province of Davao del Sur, one of the main provinces in Mindanao in Southern Philippines. She was launched on 29 September 2016 and was commissioned into service on 31 May 2017.

Operational history 
During the second week of May 2018, the BRP Davao del Sur participated in the Balikatan Exercise with US Forces together with the BRP Ramon Alcaraz (FF-16).

On the third week of May 2018, the BRP Davao del Sur participated in the commemorative activities of the first anniversary of the renaming of the Philippine Rise off the coast of Eastern Luzon. Among the activities that were done on board the ship were: 
 President Rodrigo Duterte signed the proclamation declaring portions of the Philippine Rise as a marine protected area and then led the send off for a team of Filipino scientists on a research mission to the Philippine Rise.
 A Ceremonial Flag Raising ceremony participated by military and other government personnel was also made.

BRP Davao Del Sur was deployed with BRP Andrés Bonifacio (FF-17) to RIMPAC 2018, starting their voyage on June 11, 2018 and rendezvousing with ships from several regional navies and arriving at Pearl Harbor on June 27, 2018.

Among the events the ship participated at RIMPAC were:
 An "Open Ship" one-day Guided Ship Tour for the public where students of Naval Officers Basic Course performed a Cultural Performance for the ship's visitors.
 The Sand Volleyball Tournament where the ship was declared the overall winner among the 49 teams from 25 nations that participated.

In June 2019, the ship transported the Marine Battalion Landing Team (MBLT)-3 from Zamboanga City to its new assignment in Palawan. Along the way, the BRP Davao del Sur conducted a Meeting Procedure and Photo Exercise with the Escort Flotilla One of the Japan Maritime Self Defense Force off the coast of Cagayan de Tawi-Tawi in the Sulu Sea. The Japanese ships consisted of the JS Izumo (DDH-183), JS Murasame and JS Akebono.

The BRP Davao del Sur was the 1st Philippine Navy vessel to participate in Russia's Navy Day festivities that occurred 28 July 2019.

In August 2019, the ship and its 300-man Contingent sailed from Vladivostok, Russia to meet up at sea with the BRP Conrado Yap (PS-39) in South Korea for a Group Sail back to the Philippines. Both ships were then given Arrival Honors at the Manila South Harbor which included a Meeting Procedure at sea with the BRP Emilio Jacinto (PS-35).

See also 
 List of ships of the Philippine Navy

References

External links 

2016 ships
Amphibious warfare vessels of the Philippine Navy
Tarlac-class landing platform docks
Ships built in Indonesia